The 52nd General Assembly of Nova Scotia represented Nova Scotia between 1978 and 19 September 1981.

Division of seats

There were 52 members of the General Assembly, elected in the 1978 Nova Scotia general election.

List of members

Former members of the 52nd General Assembly

References 

Terms of the General Assembly of Nova Scotia
1978 establishments in Nova Scotia
1981 disestablishments in Nova Scotia
20th century in Nova Scotia